Añejo, Spanish for "aged", may refer to:

Alcoholic drinks
 Añejo, a type of rum
 Añejo, a type of tequila

Food
 Añejo, can be applied to beef at the butchery counter
 Añejo cheese